Jonas Armin Hector (born 27 May 1990) is a German professional footballer who plays as a left back or midfielder for and captains Bundesliga club 1. FC Köln. From 2014 to 2020 he represented the Germany national team.

Club career

1. FC Köln
After beginning his youth career with SV Auersmacher in his home state of Saarland, Hector transferred to 1. FC Köln in 2010. He was promoted to the first team by coach Holger Stanislawski for the 2012–13 season and was given a debut in the first round of the DFB-Pokal against SpVgg Unterhaching on 18 August 2012. On 27 August, he made his league debut in a 2. Bundesliga match against FC Erzgebirge Aue. He established himself as a starting player for Köln during the season, making 24 appearances in the league.

In 2013–14, Hector started 33 of Köln's 34 matches as the FC won the second division championship, gaining promotion to the Bundesliga. On 4 November 2013, he scored his first professional goal in a 4–0 defeat of 1. FC Union Berlin.

The following season, he again played in all but one of Köln's league matches, making his Bundesliga debut against Hamburger SV on the first matchday. On 4 October 2014, he scored his first Bundesliga goal in a 3–2 loss at Eintracht Frankfurt. He was named Köln's Player of the Season for 2014–15 by the club's official website with 54.41% of the vote. On 31 December 2015, Hector was also named Köln's "Winner of the Year" by Cologne newspaper Express, who named the defender the club's "Mr. Reliable".

On 7 February 2016, Hector captained Köln for the first time in a 1–1 draw with Hamburger SV. At the end of the 2015–16 season, Hector was reported to have the most crosses blocked in Bundesliga, recording a total of 20 blocks.

After a successful season and an impressive Euro campaign, Hector received interest from the likes of Liverpool and Chelsea, which led to negotiations on a new contract. On 14 August 2016, Hector signed a new contract until 2021.

On 23 April 2018, Hector and the Köln announced he had signed a new contract, even though the club was effectively relegated into the 2. Bundesliga at this point. After Köln's 3–2 loss to SC Freiburg the following matchday, it was confirmed that the team had been relegated. On 12 January, he was awarded the 2018 Bundesliga Goal of the Year award for his chipped goal against Wolfsburg in the season before.

International career
On 7 November 2014, Hector was called up to the Germany national football team for the first time ahead of a UEFA Euro 2016 qualifying match against Gibraltar and a friendly against Spain. Manager Joachim Löw said "We want to get to know Jonas Hector better; he's in good form for Cologne." He made his debut in the 4–0 win over Gibraltar in Nuremberg on 14 November, replacing Erik Durm for the last 18 minutes.

On 4 September 2015, he started a Euro 2016 qualifier against Poland at left back and assisted goals for Thomas Müller and Mario Götze thus further staking his claim to the left back position for Germany.

On 29 March 2016, Hector scored his first goal for Germany in a 4–1 win over Italy in Munich.

On 31 May 2016, Hector was named in Germany's final 23-man squad for UEFA Euro 2016. On 2 July 2016, Hector scored the winning kick in the quarter-final penalty shootout against Italy to take the German team into the Euro 2016 semi-final stage.

In 2017, Hector was named in Germany's squad for the Confederations Cup in Russia. He played in all-but-one of Germany's matches at the tournament as the nation went on to lift the title.

On 15 May 2018, Hector was called up to Germany's preliminary squad for the 2018 FIFA World Cup. He was selected in Germany's final 23-man squad on 4 June 2018.

On 14 October 2020, it was reported that Hector had retired from international football and would no longer represent Germany's national team.

Career statistics

Club

International

Scores and results list Germany's goal tally first.

Honours
1. FC Köln
2. Bundesliga: 2013–14, 2018–19

Germany
FIFA Confederations Cup: 2017

References

External links

Living people
1990 births
Sportspeople from Saarbrücken
Footballers from Saarland
German footballers
Germany international footballers
Association football defenders
SV Auersmacher players
1. FC Köln players
1. FC Köln II players
Oberliga (football) players
Regionalliga players
2. Bundesliga players
Bundesliga players
UEFA Euro 2016 players
2017 FIFA Confederations Cup players
2018 FIFA World Cup players
FIFA Confederations Cup-winning players